The Bungu or Wungu are a Bantu ethnolinguistic group based in the Chunya District of Mbeya Region in south-western Tanzania.  In 1987 the Bungu population was estimated to number 38,029.

References

Ethnic groups in Tanzania
Indigenous peoples of East Africa